Steward of the Realm (Danish: Rigshofmester) was an office at the Royal Danish Court. With the coronation of Eric VII of Denmark it became an important office, taking over the role of the Seneschal (Danish: Drost) as the de facto prime minister of the country. Prior to that the Rigshofmester had merely been the administrative leader of the Royal Court. The office was abolished with the institution of Absolute monarchy in Denmark-Norway in 1660.

Danish Stewards of the Realm

References

Political history of Denmark